Dae Jang Geum Theme Park is a restored and renovated outdoor set owned by Munhwa Broadcasting Corporation where most of the Korean drama Dae Jang Geum was filmed.

History
The area of outdoor set is about 2,000 square meters within the MBC Yangjoo Culture Valley which is located in Mansong-dong, Yangju City, Gyeonggi Province. It was once used as a filming location of earlier historical themed dramas such as Hur Jun and Sangdo, Merchants of Joseon, other variety shows were produced there as well, prior to its opening to the public.

Opening
Opened to the public in December 2004, the Dae Jang Geum Theme Park is South Korea's first drama theme park. It was made for spreading Korean Wave and introducing not only Korean culture but Korean court culture.

There are 23 facilities such as Dae Jeon, Dae Bi Jeon, Soo Ra Gan (So Joo Bang), Toi Sun Gan, Oak Sa, Guest house, Sa Ong Won, Brewery and so on. There are also some instruments that was used when the Dae Jang Geum was filmed. Events and experience programs are progressing at this place so that visitors can see and experience various things.

Closure
Due to some damages to its temporal building structures and for visitors' safety reasons, the theme park was closed to the public on January 1, 2014, while it continues on as a filming location for producing future historical themed dramas and variety shows.

References

External links
 
 Dae Jang Geum Theme Park website 

Munhwa Broadcasting Corporation
South Korean film studios
Amusement parks in South Korea
Defunct amusement parks
Tourist attractions in Gyeonggi Province
Buildings and structures in Gyeonggi Province
Amusement parks opened in 2004
Amusement parks closed in 2014